440 may refer to:

440, the year
440 BC, the year
440 (number), the number

It can also refer to:
 The 440-yard dash, a track-and-field event
Area code 440, a telephone area code in the Cleveland, Ohio area
A440 (pitch standard), the frequency of the note A above middle C used in standard western music theory
440, the backup band for Dominican musician Juan Luis Guerra
Volvo 440/460, an automobile model
4-4-0, a type of steam locomotive

See also